Hard Luck Love Song is a 2020 American romantic drama film directed by Justin Corsbie in his feature directorial debut and starring Michael Dorman, Sophia Bush, Dermot Mulroney, Eric Roberts, Brian Sacca, Melora Walters and RZA.  It is based on the song "Just Like Old Times" by Todd Snider.

It was released in limited release of October 15, 2021. It received mixed-to-positive reviews from film critics.

Cast
 Michael Dorman as Jesse
 Sophia Bush as Carla
 RZA as Louis
 Dermot Mulroney as Rollo
 Brian Sacca as Officer Zach
 Melora Walters as Sally "Gypsy Sally"
 Eric Roberts as Skip

Casting
Dorman and Bush were cast as the leads of the film on July 16, 2018.  Mulroney and Walters were cast in the film on July 23, 2018.

Release
The film premiered at the Austin Film Festival on October 24, 2020.

On July 19, 2021, Roadside Attractions acquired the distribution rights to the film and set it for a October 15, 2021 release.

Critical reception
The film received positive reviews from IndieWire, the Los Angeles Times, Texas Monthly, The Hollywood Reporter and Richard Roeper of the Chicago Sun-Times. The site's critical consensus reads, "Well-acted but fatally self-indulgent, Hard Luck Love Song is ultimately less cinematic than the Todd Snider song that inspired it." Metacritic reported a weighted average of 56 out of 100 based on 8 reviews, indicating "mixed or average reviews".

References

External links
 Official Site
 

2020 romantic drama films
Films based on songs
2020 directorial debut films
2020 films
American romantic drama films
2020s English-language films
2020s American films
English-language romantic drama films